Sugartree Township is a township in Carroll County, in the U.S. state of Missouri.

Sugartree Township was named for the sugar maple trees within its borders.

References

Townships in Missouri
Townships in Carroll County, Missouri